

Events
A gang war breaks out between Paul Kelly's Five Points Gang and "Kid Twist" Max Zwerbach's Eastman Gang. 
By the end of the year Johnny Torrio's two dozen Brooklyn brothels earn over $5,000 a week. 
Frankie Yale is allowed to join Johnny Torrio's Black Hand organization in New York. 
Hymie Weiss is first arrested for burglary. It is this incident that, while caught robbing a perfume store, he is dubbed the "Perfume Burglar" by Chicago reporters. 
Joseph Petrosino arrests Neapolitan camorrista Enrico Costabili, who is later deported to Italy. 
Sicilian mafiosi Raffaele Palizzolo, wanted for murder, escapes Sicily and  arrives in New York. He later leaves the city before Joseph Petrosino can arrest him.  
Then 17-year-old Salvatore Sabella, future boss of the Philadelphia crime family, is sentenced to three years imprisonment in Milan for the murder of a local butcher, of which he was an apprentice, in 1905. 
April 25 – Frank Costello is arrested for assault and robbery but is released. 
May 14 – Eastman Gang leader Max Zwerbach and lieutenant Vach Lewis are killed in an ambush by members of the Five Points Gang after an argument between Zwerbach and Louis Pioggi over Coney Island dance hall girl Carrol Terry.
July 23 – Labor racketeer Cornelius Shea is sentenced to six months in prison for abandoning his wife and two young children.

Births
Ernest Rupolo, Genovese crime family assassin
March 17 – Raymond L. S. Patriarca, boss of the Patriarca crime family
May 24 – Sam (Salvatore) Giancana, boss of the Chicago Outfit
June 30 – Samuel "Teets" Battaglia, member of the Chicago Outfit
September 6 – Anthony Joseph Biase, leader of the Omaha faction of the National Crime Syndicate
October 7 – Harry "Happy" Maione, Murder, Inc. hitman

Deaths
May 14 – Max Zwerbach, leader of New York City's Eastman Gang
May 14 – Vach Lewis, Eastman Gang lieutenant

Organized crime
Years in organized crime